Tim Kraayenbrink (born 1959) is the Iowa State Senator from the 5th District. A Republican, he has served in the Iowa Senate since winning election in 2015.

Born in Paullina, Iowa, Kraayenbrink went on to attend Northern State College in South Dakota. He spent time as a teacher and football coach for the Northwest Webster School District. Later he started his own financial firm which he had led for over 25 years before he decided to run for public office. He currently resides in Fort Dodge with his wife Sally. They have three children and two grandchildren.

As of February 2020, Kraayenbrink serves on the following committees: Appropriations (Vice Chair), Education, and Local Government. He also serves on the Education Appropriations Subcommittee (Chair), as well as the Fiscal Committee, School Finance Formula Review Committee, Career and Technical Education Implementation Study Committee, and the College Student Aid Commission.

Electoral history

References 

Republican Party Iowa state senators
Living people
People from O'Brien County, Iowa
People from Fort Dodge, Iowa
1959 births
21st-century American politicians
Northern State University alumni